Ochetobius elongatus is a species of cyprinid fish found in eastern Asia.  It is the only member of its genus.

References

Cyprinid fish of Asia
Freshwater fish of China
Fish described in 1867